The 1928 United States Senate election in Texas was held on November 6, 1928. Incumbent Democratic U.S. Senator Earle Mayfield ran for re-election to a second term, but lost the Democratic primary to U.S. Representative Tom Connally. Connally went on to easily win the general election.

Democratic primary

Candidates
Thomas L. Blanton, U.S. Representative from Albany
Tom Connally, U.S. Representative from Marlin
Minnie Fisher Cunningham, suffragette and Executive Secretary of the League of Women Voters
Earle B. Mayfield, incumbent U.S. Senator since 1923
A. Jeff McLemore, newspaper publisher, former U.S. Representative representing Texas at-large, and State Representative from Corpus Christi (1892–96)
Alvin M. Owsley, attorney and former National Commander of the American Legion

Results

Runoff

General election

Results

See also 
 1928 United States Senate elections

References

Texas
1928
Senate